Serial Mom is a 1994 American black comedy crime film written and directed by John Waters, starring Kathleen Turner as the title character, Sam Waterston as her husband, along with Ricki Lake and Matthew Lillard as her children. Patty Hearst, Suzanne Somers, Joan Rivers, Traci Lords, and Brigid Berlin make cameo appearances in the film.

Serial Mom was released theatrically in the United States on April 13, 1994 to mixed to positive reviews from critics, but was a box office bomb, grossing nearly $8 million from a $13 million budget. The film is widely regarded as a cult classic.

Plot
Beverly Sutphin appears to be an unassuming upper middle class housewife living with her dentist husband, Eugene; and their teenage children, Misty and Chip, in the suburbs of Baltimore. However, she is secretly a serial killer, murdering those who she perceives to slight her and her family or fail to live up to her moral standards.

During breakfast, Detectives Pike and Gracey question the family about the vulgar harassment of their neighbor, Dottie Hinkle. Beverly is later revealed to be the perpetrator, retaliating against Dottie for having taken a parking space from her. At a PTA meeting, math teacher Paul Stubbins criticizes Chip's interest in horror films, believing that Beverly's parenting is adversely affecting his mental health. Subsequently, Beverly runs over Stubbins with her car, killing him; stoner LuAnn Hodges witnesses the murder. The following day, Misty is upset when Carl Pageant stands her up for a date. Beverly spots Carl with another girl at a swap meet and fatally stabs him with a fire iron.

At Gracey's suggestion, Eugene discovers Beverly's serial killer memorabilia beneath their mattress, which includes recordings from Ted Bundy on the week of his execution. That evening at dinner, Chip tells the family about his friend Scotty's suspicions. Beverly departs at that point; fearing for Scotty's life, the others head for his house. Unbeknownst to them, Beverly intends to kill Ralph and Betty Sterner for calling Eugene to treat the former's toothache on a day Eugene and Beverly planned to spend birdwatching, eating chicken, and critiquing Eugene's requests for perfect dental health. She stabs Betty with scissors borrowed from Rosemary Ackerman and pushes an air conditioner from their window onto Ralph. Meanwhile, the rest of the family and the police arrive at Scotty's house, only to find him masturbating to an erotic film.

On Sunday, police follow the Sutphins to church as Beverly is named as the prime suspect in the Sterners' murders. The service abruptly ends when everyone flees in panic after Beverly sneezes, during which she escapes as police attempt to arrest her. She hides at the video store where Chip is employed; Emmy Lou Jenson, a customer, argues with Chip over being fined for failing to rewind a videotape, calling him a "son of a psycho". Beverly follows Jenson home and fatally strikes her with a leg of lamb as she watches Annie. Scotty witnesses the attack nearby; Beverly spots him and pursues him after carjacking a passerby. Ending up at Hammerjack's, Beverly immolates Scotty during a live performance. The Sutphin family arrive as Beverly is arrested.

Beverly's trial becomes a media sensation; she is dubbed "Serial Mom", and both Chip and Misty profit off of her notoriety. During the opening arguments, Beverly's lawyer claims that she is not guilty by reason of insanity, but is promptly dismissed. Representing herself, Beverly systematically discredits every witness against her by exploiting their own vices, while Hodges is too high to provide credible testimony. During Pike's testimony, the courtroom is distracted by the arrival of Suzanne Somers, who is cast as Beverly in a television film.

Beverly is acquitted of all charges. Throughout the trial, Beverly expresses contempt at a particular juror for wearing white shoes after Labor Day. Beverly follows her to a payphone and fatally strikes her with the receiver. Before realizing the truth, Somers angers Beverly into an outburst attempting to pose for a photo op. The juror's body is then discovered.

Cast

Production
During pre-production, Waters suggested other actresses for the role of Beverly including Meryl Streep, Kathy Bates and Glenn Close, before Turner was cast.

Films by Waters' creative influences, including Doris Wishman, Otto Preminger, William Castle and Herschell Gordon Lewis, are seen playing on television sets throughout the film.

The audio for Ted Bundy in one of Beverly's correspondences with the jailed killer is the voice of Waters.

Release
The film was screened out of competition as the closing night film at the 1994 Cannes Film Festival.

Critical reception
The film received mixed to positive reviews from critics, and currently holds a 63% approval rating on Rotten Tomatoes based on 52 reviews, with an average rating of 5.9/10. Roger Ebert awarded it an average two stars (out of a possible four), finding some of Waters' satire effective but feeling that Kathleen Turner's decision to portray her character's mental illness with realism instead of in a campy fashion, while brave, made the character difficult to laugh at. "Watch Serial Mom closely and you'll realize that something is miscalculated at a fundamental level. Turner's character is helpless and unwitting in a way that makes us feel almost sorry for her—and that undermines the humor. She isn't funny crazy, she's sick crazy."

However, other critics were more enthusiastic about the film and Turner's performance; Cosmopolitan stated in its review that "Turner has never been so over the top hilarious", and Scene magazine called the film "hysterically funny".

Critics lauded Waters' style and savage satire of the US's obsession with true crime, such as when Beverly's daughter, Misty, is seen selling T-shirts outside the courthouse where her mother's fate will be decided.

Box office
The film opened on April 13, 1994 and grossed $2 million in its opening weekend, ranking number 11 at the US box office. By the end of its run, the film had grossed $7.8 million in the United States and Canada. The film has become a cult classic since its release.

Year-end lists
 Honorable mention – Dan Craft, The Pantagraph
 Guilty pleasure – Douglas Armstrong, The Milwaukee Journal

Home media
Universal Studios and Focus Features released a collector's edition DVD of the film on May 6, 2008, replacing the original HBO Home Video DVD release, which is out of print. The new DVD release features an audio commentary with Waters and Turner. The film was released as a Collector's Edition Blu-ray from Shout! Factory on May 9, 2017.

References

External links

 
 
 
 
 Original 1992 script at IMSDb

1994 films
1994 comedy films
1994 crime thriller films
1994 independent films
1990s American films
1990s black comedy films
1990s comedy thriller films
1990s crime comedy films
1990s English-language films
1990s satirical films
1990s serial killer films
American black comedy films
American comedy thriller films
American crime comedy films
American crime thriller films
American independent films
American satirical films
American serial killer films
Films directed by John Waters
Films scored by Basil Poledouris
Films set in Baltimore
Films shot in Baltimore
Savoy Pictures films